Little Charmers is a Canadian CGI-animated children's television series produced by Nelvana and Spin Master Entertainment for Treehouse TV. The series premiered on Nickelodeon in the United States on January 12, 2015, and ended on April 15, 2017. Treehouse TV announced a week later that it was scheduled in Canada on January 31; however, the second episode debuted six days after this announcement, and six days prior to the scheduled debut. 57 episodes were produced.

Characters

Main
 Hazel Charming (voiced by Addison Holley) is a young Charmer and Enchantress-in-training whose magic is known for its tendency not to work out well, to the point that her magical mishaps are known as being Hazeled. Sometimes she uses her wand in the Charmhouse. Her musical instrument in Rainbow Sparkle is a guitar.
 Lavender (voiced by Alexa Torrington) is a bow-loving and purple-haired Charmer who uses her wand for making potions to help the others. She has won awards for fashion design. Her catchphrase is "Charmazing!" Her musical instrument in Rainbow Sparkle is a set of drums. She is the only non-white main character.
 Posie (voiced by Matilda Gilbert) is a lighthearted Charmer who uses her wand to play it as the flute. She has two brothers, her older brother is Parsley and her baby brother is Thistle. Easily excitable and very gentle, Posie is optimistic and peaceful by default. She sees the beauty in everything and can be very sweet with a motherly flair and ability to trust her instincts. She can be easily distracted however, and is very chatty to the point of accidentally being blunt with others or a little rude. Posie does her best to keep everyone encouraged and uplifted. Her musical instrument in Rainbow Sparkle is a keyboard.
 Mr. Charming (voiced by Andrew Sabiston) is Hazel's bespectacled wizard father and the owner of a broom store.
 Mrs. Charming (aka Enchantress or The Enchantress) (voiced by Lisette St. Louis) is Hazel's mother and the most powerful Charmer. In her role as Enchantress, she uses her magic to deal with problems around Charmville. 
 Seven is Hazel's cat.
 Flare is Lavender's dragon.
 Treble is Posie's owl.
 Parsley (voiced by Lucius Hoyos) is Posie's older brother. Although not seen using his powers as often, he is also capable of casting charms and cause mischief. He works at Mr. Charming's broom shop as an assistant and has a slight rivalry with Hazel.
Thistle is the baby brother of Posie and Parsley.

Recurring
 Prince Ferg is a frog prince of the pond. Was originally a normal prince but was turned into a frog, though he reveals that both his father and grandfather had been frog princes as well.
 Gary the Gnome shows up in several episodes.
 Mrs. Greensparkle the schoolteacher shows up in several episodes.
 Olive shows up in several episodes.
 Willow shows up in several episodes.
 a green mother dragon returns in 'Dragon Daycare' after being shown in an earlier episode.
 Nelson the Gnome appear in "Nelson in Charge" to babysit the Charmers.
 Picklemunchinfeet (nicknamed Pickles) (voiced by Brian Froud) is a lonely ogre the charmers befriend.
 Princess Corina is a mermaid that Hazel befriends.
 Splish is the childhood nickname of Corina's mother when she was friends with Chanty.

Episodes

Merchandise
All 14 toys based on the series were made in Canada, United States, and Europe. Spin Master made toys including dolls, figurines, plushies and RPGs. Additionally, bedding was made by Baby Boom Consumer Products, cake decorations by Bakery Crafts Halloween costumes by Rubie's Costume Company, and other products by Scholastic.

Four games for the series, Charmers in Training, Hazel Eyes, Junior Brooms, and Sparkle Up! were made as well.

Broadcast and home media
Little Charmers premiered on Nickelodeon in the U.S. on January 12, 2015, on Nick Jr. in Australia and New Zealand on May 4, 2015, on Nick Jr. Too in the United Kingdom and Ireland on June 22, on Nick Jr. in Southeast Asia and Europe on July 6, and on 3Kids in Ireland. It was shown in Spacetoon in the Middle East. Until December 2022, Starz Kids & Family also aired the series in every even-numbered month, but only at its first season due to its second and final one being unavailable.

In the mid-late 2010s, eOne released DVDs along with kaBOOM! in North America.

As of 2023, the series is now streaming on Tubi, but not episodes 21 through 44 (labeled as part of "season 2").

References

External links
 
 
 Little Charmers at Nick Jr.

Canadian computer-animated television series
2010s Canadian animated television series
2015 Canadian television series debuts
2017 Canadian television series endings
Canadian children's animated action television series
Canadian children's animated adventure television series
Canadian children's animated comedy television series
Canadian children's animated fantasy television series
Canadian preschool education television series
Animated preschool education television series
2010s preschool education television series
English-language television shows
Television series by Nelvana
Television series by Corus Entertainment
Nick Jr. original programming
Treehouse TV original programming
Animated television series about children
Animated television series about orphans
Television about magic
Witchcraft in television
Television series about shapeshifting
Television series about size change
Anime-influenced Western animated television series